Fauda (from  fawḍā, meaning "chaos") is an Israeli television series developed by Lior Raz and Avi Issacharoff drawing on their experiences in the Israel Defense Forces. The series premiered on 15 February 2015. It tells the story of Doron, a commander in the Mista'arvim unit and his team; in the first season, they pursue a Hamas arch-terrorist known as "The Panther".

The first season was filmed in Kafr Qasim during the 2014 Israel–Gaza conflict. It premiered on 15 February 2015. The second season premiered on 31 December 2017. The third season takes place in the Gaza Strip and was aired in 2019 and 2020. Internationally, the series is streamed by Netflix. A fourth season dropped in early 2023.

Plot

Season 1
Eighteen months prior to the start of the show, the Israeli soldier Doron and his unit were credited with killing the terrorist Taufiq Hammed. Following this, Doron retires from service in order to grow a vineyard. At the beginning of season 1 Doron is visited by Moreno, the commander of his old unit, who informs him that Taufiq Hammed is still alive and plans to attend his brother Bashir's wedding. Doron rejoins his team in order to go undercover at the wedding. Ultimately they are discovered and Bashir is killed, moments before Taufiq is to arrive. Although Doron is able to shoot Taufiq, and injures him, Taufiq escapes.

Taufiq barely survives the gunshot wound and is forced to have secret emergency surgery so as to not reveal that he is alive or where he is. Doron convinces Moreno to allow him to stay on with the unit until they catch Taufiq. Bashir's family all mourn him as a shahid (martyr) and his wife, Amal, vows revenge. Taufiq's right-hand man, Walid, convinces his cousin Shirin to help Taufiq escape from the hospital minutes before Doron's team arrives.

Amal, distraught over Bashir's death, volunteers to bomb a nightclub which Boaz, Doron's brother-in-law and a member of his unit, frequents. This will ensure that the Israelis get the message that it is revenge on Boaz for the killing of Bashir. The plan is for Amal to arm the bomb in her purse and then leave the club three minutes before its detonation. However, Amal decides to stay and die in the explosion. Boaz regains consciousness following the blast and finds his girlfriend's body. Boaz does not handle the discovery well, and after getting pulled over, physically assaults the police and ends up in jail.

While on a mission, Boaz gets captured and is held hostage by Hamas. Doron and his team decide to prepare an unapproved mission to kidnap Taufiq's friend Sheikh Awadalla in an attempt to get Boaz back. When Doron finds out that Taufiq had a bomb implanted inside of Boaz, the team kidnap Taufiq's daughter to use as additional leverage. Ultimately Boaz and the Sheikh both get blown up, and Taufiq's daughter gets badly injured.

Doron, still undercover, interviews for a position to be a shahid for Taufiq, a role which he ultimately gets recruited for. Taufiq reveals his plan to Walid: they received sarin nerve gas that will be detonated in the synagogue, which will cause Israel to retaliate with force, committing war crimes and forcing other Islamic states to respond. Walid eventually discovers Doron's true identity and orders Doron to be killed, however the rest of the unit shows up just in time to kill everyone who was watching him. Walid shows the proof to Taufiq and then shoots him in the back of the head.

Characters

Main

Doron Kavillio
Portrayed by Lior Raz. Doron is married to Gali, and has a son, Ido, and a daughter, Noga. Doron, after leaving the army, lives on a farm and grows grapes in order to make his own wine. Doron having previously been credited with killing Abu Ahmad, rejoins his old Israel Defense Force (IDF) unit, 18 months later, after intelligence discovered Abu Ahmad was still alive.

Gali, behind Doron's back, has been having an affair with a fellow member of his unit, Naor. His son, Ido, eventually finds out about the affair while listening in on a phone conversation, and later sees them kissing on the couch from upstairs. Ido eventually pulls Naor's gun on him stating that his father is not there because of him, which Doron interrupts, and Ido tells Doron that they are together. When Doron asks Gali what it means, she tells him that he stopped fighting for her a long time ago, and that Naor loves her.

After Boaz's girlfriend gets killed, Doron wants to try and keep Boaz out of the field for his own safety. When Boaz is captured during his first field mission following the loss Doron takes it very personally and blames Moreno for it, physically attacking him in the command center. Doron, although having previously quit smoking begins smoking again to help cope with the stress of the Boaz situation. Ultimately Doron comes up with a plan to kidnap Sheikh Awadalla, and Taufiq's daughter Abir, in order to exchange for Boaz, although it ultimately proved unsuccessful. Steve later takes Doron to Boaz's grave where he cries while reciting Kaddish.

After Boaz's bomb is detonated Doron begins to wander the streets aimlessly, before taking shelter in a mosque. Doron wounded after the Boaz's and Sheikh's bombs explode, ultimately winds up at Shirin's apartment for treatment, after which they passionately kiss. Shirin however eventually walks out during a date with Doron when she received a video from Walid showing her who Doron really is.

Doron, just prior to shooting the person sent to kill Shirin, finds out from him that Taufiq is looking for a man to be a shahid. Doron goes and interviews with Walid and Taufiq for the position, and is handed a phone to be called when needed. Before he can complete his mission, he is arrested and brought back to Israel, but ultimately answers Walid's call while in jail. Gabi convinces Gideon to allow Doron to complete his mission, and if successful would receive a full pardon.

Taufiq Hammed
Portrayed by Hisham Sulliman. Taufiq is commonly referred to as Abu Ahmad, and is nicknamed "The Panther". He is married to Nassrin and had a son (Ahmad), a daughter (Abir). Taufiq had been trained by Ali Karmi, since he was a kid, and considers him a father, however he ordered Ali to be killed, when Ali turned his back on him and gave information over to Israel in exchange for surgery for his daughter.

Taufiq, is a high level Hamas terrorist, who was assumed killed by the IDF 18 months prior to the beginning of the show, only to find out he is still alive and arranging terror attacks, despite having had a funeral. Taufiq emerges from hiding, and is seen for the first time by his family since his funeral, in order to congratulate his brother on his upcoming wedding. Taufiq is credited with killing 116 Israelis.

Taufiq does not see his family for several years while in hiding, and was willing to risk his life just to see Nassrin immediately after surgery. Despite this, when forced to choose between exploding the bomb inside Boaz and Abir's safety, he reluctantly chooses to have Walid detonate the bomb. When Nassrin tells Taufiq that she cannot live this life anymore and is taking the kids back to Berlin, Taufiq attempts to talk her out of it. When his mother later calls to say that the kids and her passports were gone, Taufiq is brought to tears.

Taufiq throughout season 1 is planning for something big, later revealed that they will use sarin nerve gas to detonated in the synagogue, which will cause Israel to retaliate with force, committing war crimes, which will force the other Islamic states to respond. After Walid uncovers that the man they hired to be the shahid for their mission was actually Doron, Walid returns to show Taufiq, then shoots him in the head from behind.

Walid Al Abed
Portrayed by Shadi Mar'i. Walid as of season 1 he is 20 years old. Walid is a trusted member is Taufiq's team, and one of the few who knows the truth about him being alive after his funeral. Taufiq views Walid like a son to him, and eventually Taufiq wants Walid to replace him. Walid however eventually winds up killing Taufiq, shooting him in the head from behind, however after shooting him, Walid cries and kisses Taufiq.

Walid puts the Hamas cause above everything else, including family, as he eventually shows by kidnapping his aunt and cousin to further their cause. Although always wanting to follow through on what Taufiq tells him, when it comes to his family, Walid will not hurt them. When ordered to find Shirin and bring her back to Taufiq, Walid questions her but ultimately reports back that he is unable to find her.

When Walid was a kid he used to wait for Shirin to return from Paris so she could take him to the park. Walid feels that he never knew what true love was until he met Shrin. When ordered to kill Shirin by Taufiq, Walid instead asks her to marry him, as a way to protect her. Shirin eventually reluctantly agrees and says yes, but pulls away when he tries to kiss her. Shirin later tells him that they are cousins and she cannot marry him because she doesn't love him. Walid believes this is because she is in love with Amir, and once Walid finds out who Amir really is, Walid sends Shirin the proof that Amir is Doron, and she walks out on him during a date.

Dr. Shirin Al Abed
Portrayed by Laëtitia Eïdo. Shirin is 32 years old as of season 1, and a cousin of Walid. Her mother is from Nablus, her father is from Paris. She volunteered with Doctors Without Borders in 2006. She studied medicine at An-Najah National University, and works in the emergency room of Rafidia Surgery Hospital. She is a widow, who was originally married at age 23 to a chemist, named Naji, who died four years later, from multiple sclerosis. She spent more of her life in Paris than in Israel, and left Paris after Naji died to be closer to her mother.

Shirin, although has feelings for Doron is hesitant to accept his advances, but ultimately agrees to a date with him. After Doron left their date early, Shirin is put off by his advances and sends the flowers he gave her as an apology, to the pediatric ward. After Doron comes to her apartment for treatment, Doron kisses Shirin, to which she returns the kiss and quickly slips out of her dress. Shirin eventually walks out during a date with Doron when she receives a video from Walid showing who Doron really is.

Shirin ultimately helps Taufiq escape from the hospital based on Walid's insistence, however does so only for family, not because she believes in the cause. When Walid later calls Shirin and asks her to stitch up Taufiq, she refuses as she does not want to be involved.

Shirin later performs surgery on Boaz, reluctantly, after Walid kidnaps her and takes her mother as hostage until she performs the surgery. Following the surgery she calls Walid and insists that she must be able to check up on him to ensure he does not have an infection. Shirin admitted to Doron what she did, thinking he is a member of the Palestinian Preventive Security. After Doron's unit reveals to Walid they know he planted a bomb inside Boaz, Taufiq orders the killing of Shirin, but she is ultimately saved by Doron, when he kills the men Taufiq sent.

After the men sent to kill Shirin did not return, Taufiq ordered Walid to find Shirin and kill her. Walid comes to Shirin's hotel room and reveals that when he was a kid he used to wait for her to return from Paris so she could take him to the park. Walid feels that he never knew what true love was until he met Shrin, and instead of killing her asks her to marry him, as a way to protect her, to which she says she needs to think about. Shirin eventually reluctantly agrees and says yes, but pulls away when he tries to kiss her. Shirin later tells him that they are cousins and she cannot marry him because she doesn't love him.

Captain Ayub (Gabi)
Portrayed by Itzik Cohen. He has been divorced twice, and lives by himself. He has five kids, with the youngest son being named Nadav, and has another son named Yiftah. Gabi's favorite time is, every year, when his family goes to the desert on vacation, and he has no mode of communication with those who are not with him.

Mickey Moreno
Portrayed by Yuval Segal, commander of Doron's former unit, who pulled him back in. He is romantically involved with Nurit. Following the issues which followed Boaz's capture, Moreno met with Gideon Avital in order to tell him his futures plans for the unit, only to be told he was being let go, with the unit being disbanded. Moreno ultimately blackmails Avital into giving him his unit back, or else he will reveal to the press that the two of them had shot five prisoners in the head in Gaza years ago.

Gali Kavillio
Portrayed by Netta Garti. Gali is Doron's wife, and Boaz's older sister. She is very unhappy with their life and wishes she could move outside of Israel. 

Gali is having an affair with a member of Doron's unit, Naor, and says she is no longer in love with Doron. Her son eventually finds out about the affair while listening in on their phone conversation, and later sees them kissing on the couch from upstairs. Ido eventually pulls Naor's gun on him stating that his father is not there because of him. Gali later tells Doron that he stopped fighting for her years ago, and she was afraid of him.

Nassrin Hamed
Portrayed by Hanan Hillo. Nassrin is the wife of Taufiq, and her mother is Hafida. Nassrin grew up in Germany.

Although she supports her husband's mission, she wishes she could have her family intact. After Abir was kidnapped and injured, Nassrin refuses to speak with Taufiq and demands that she go see her daughter in Israel, no matter what others will think.

Nassrin ultimately decides she can no longer live this life, and tells Taufiq that once Abir leaves the hospital she is taking the kids with her back to Berlin. Following Abir's surgery, Gabi presents Nassrin their passports and tells her they have a taxi outside ready for them to go to the airport, where he will arrange for their travel to Berlin.

Boaz
Portrayed by Tomer Kapon. Boaz is fluent in Arabic, and is a member of Doron's unit. As a cover he states he works with Arabs in the Ministry of Defense. He is Gali's younger brother.

Although Boaz survives a bombing of the nightclub he frequents, his girlfriend, Daria, does not. Unable to cope with the loss of Daria, Boaz drunkly destroys his apartment, then gets arrested while driving his motorcycle, and then beats up the cop. Following this Boaz has trouble maintaining his temper and coping with day-to-day life, and always wears her necklace.

Although Doron wants to keep Boaz out of the field while he recovers, Moreno insists he returns to the field, where he ultimately gets captured on his first mission back. While being questioned by Walid, Boaz states his name is Mohammad Abu Snina from Surda, and works for the Intelligence Agency, and provides documentation to support his story. When questioned by Taufiq, Boaz is able to convince him that his story is legitimate but is ultimately discovered when Taufiq recognized his tattoo as the man who shot Bashir. While captured, following surgery, Taufiq tells Boaz he took his kidney in order to give it to Ali Karmi's daughter, only to later find out they really implanted a bomb. Despite Doron's best efforts Taufiq eventually gives the order to explode the bomb inside Boaz, killing him.

Naor
Portrayed by Tzachi Halevy. Naor is a member of Doron unit. He has been having an affair with Doron's wife for over a year. When Gali mentions she is ready to leave Doron for him, he tells her to wait, because its complicated with Doron back in the unit. Following the issues which followed Boaz's capture, Moreno intended to make Naor team leader, before Moreno was also told the unit would be disbanded.

Nurit
Portrayed by Rona-Lee Shimon, is the sole female member of Doron's unit. She is romantically involved with Moreno. 

Although her role always kept her behind the scenes, she wished to move into the field, and actively trains for the eventuality. When she finally gets her chance, she is assigned to enter the women's locker room in order to clone Shirin's phone, and although nervous keeps composed whenever she is watched. During her second opportunity in the field, when an Arab woman attempts to stab her, she shoots her in the arm; when the woman attempts to stab her with her other arm, Nurit is forced to shoot her again, this time fatally. 

Although Nurit takes part in the mission to kidnap Sheikh Awadalla, she is shown emotionally crying while he is being tortured. Following the issues which followed Boaz's capture, Moreno informed Steve and Avihai that he was being discharged, then told Nurit that he felt she was forced into going and therefore he wanted to keep her on, before Moreno was later told the unit was being disbanded.

Avihai
Portrayed by Boaz Konforty. Avihai is a member of Doron's unit, he has a wife and one son (Guy). Avihai considers himself like an attack dog, where he needs to always be ready to jump right into action, without thinking about the emotion. Following the issues which followed Boaz's capture, Moreno informed Avihai that he was being discharged, before Moreno was also told the unit would be disbanded.

Steve Pinto
Portrayed by Doron Ben-David. Steve is a member of Doron's unit. Although he goes by Steve, his birth name is Hertzel. Steve has a crush on Nurit, and attempts to kiss her while staking out Abir. Following the issues which followed Boaz's capture, Moreno informed Steve that he was being discharged, before Moreno was told the unit would be disbanded. Steve later brings Doron to Boaz's grave, where he cries while reciting Kaddish.

Recurring
  Ido Kavillio portrayed by Mel Malka, son of Doron and Gali. Ido, eventually finds out about the affair his mother is having with Naor, while listening in on a phone conversation, and later sees them kissing on the couch from upstairs. Ido eventually pulls Naor's gun on him stating that his father is not there because of him. After Doron stops him, Ido states that he should have killed him. 
 Jihan Hamed portrayed by Khawlah Hag-Debsy
 Sheikh Awadalla portrayed by Salim Dau, is a spiritual leader and a close and trusted friend of Taufiq. When Taufiq wants to exchange Boaz for Hamas members imprisoned by Israel, Sheikh is the man he wants to run negotiations with Egypt. After Taufiq gives the order to detonate the bomb inside Boaz, Doron orders the bomb vest strapped to Sheikh to be detonated as well, killing him.
 Gideon Avital portrayed by Uri Gavriel, is the Minister of Defense. While in Gaza with Moreno, years prior to entering politics, they shot five prisoners in the head.

Distribution
In the summer of 2016, the satellite network yes officially picked up season 2 of the show, stating it will focus more on real world events. During the fall of 2017 the initial trailer was released, and the official premier date was later announced to be 31 December. A few weeks prior to the airing of season 2, Fauda was renewed for a third season, to air in 2019.

The series is distributed by the online streaming service Netflix, billed as a Netflix original program, and premiered on 2 December 2016. Season 2 was added to Netflix in May 2018.

Episodes

Summary

Season 1

Season 2

Reception

Accolades 
In 2016, the show took six awards, including Best Drama Series, at the Israeli Academy Awards. In December 2017, The New York Times voted Fauda among the best international shows of 2017. In 2018, the show took 11 Israeli TV Academy Awards, including best TV drama, best actor for Lior Raz and also best screenplay, casting, cinematography, recording, special effects and in other categories. 

The review aggregator Rotten Tomatoes indicated that 100% of reviews were favourable for all three seasons.

Criticism
Rachel Shabi, writing in The Guardian, criticised the show for its politics and its "relentless machismo". According to Yasmeen Serhan of The Atlantic, "Viewers who are hungry for a Palestinian perspective on the conflict would do well to urge Netflix to commission a Palestinian-created series, because Fauda will probably prove a disappointment." George Zeidan of Right to Movement Palestine, was more strident; in Haaretz, he wrote "The Middle East is already bursting with disinformation, insinuations and dangerous propaganda: there's no need for yet more. Fauda can do better." An article by Yara Hawari in Al Jazeera about the "latest surge of programmes focusing on Israel and trying to show it as a force for good" gave the opinion that "although not as crude as classic Orientalist cinema and TV, these programmes are no less racist and perhaps even more dangerous in their subtlety and slick presentation." Reviewers have described it as "shooting and crying".

Indian adaptation
In November 2019, content studio Applause Entertainment (promoted by Aditya Birla Group) announced that there will be an Indian remake of Fauda, which will highlight the complicated relationship between India and Pakistan. Tanaav, the Indian remake of Fauda,  premiered on SonyLIV on 11 November 2022.

See also
Bethlehem
Hostages (Israeli TV series)
Television in Israel

Notes

References

External links

 

2015 Israeli television series debuts
Israeli drama television series
Israeli action television series
Shin Bet in fiction
Yes (Israel) original programming
Thriller television series
Espionage television series
Islam in fiction
Israeli military television series
Serial drama television series
Terrorism in television